Gasi is a small settlement in the east of Kenya's Coast Province. It is next to the southern coast of Kenya by the Indian Ocean, where fishing is common.

As of October 2019, it has a population of 5,222.

References

Bibliography
  (p. 105 )

Populated places in Coast Province